Ramón Calderón Batres (born 29 October 1938) is a Mexican Roman Catholic bishop.

Calderón Batres was ordained to the priesthood in 1962. He served as bishop of the Roman Catholic Diocese of Linares, Mexico, from 1988 to 2014.

References

External links

21st-century Roman Catholic bishops in Mexico
1938 births
Living people
20th-century Roman Catholic bishops in Mexico
Place of birth missing (living people)